Buttons is a 1927 American silent drama film directed by George W. Hill and written by Marian Constance Blackton, Ralph Spence, and Hayden Talbot. The film stars Jackie Coogan, Lars Hanson, Gertrude Olmstead, Paul Hurst, and Roy D'Arcy. The film was released on December 24, 1927, by Metro-Goldwyn-Mayer.

It is one of the few Jackie Coogan films to be considered a lost film.

Cast

References

External links

Jackie Coogan in Buttons (1927), stills from the collection of director George W. Hill, at http://www.oocities.org

1927 films
1920s English-language films
Silent American drama films
1927 drama films
Metro-Goldwyn-Mayer films
Films directed by George Hill
American black-and-white films
American silent feature films
Lost American films
1927 lost films
Lost drama films
1920s American films